Bell and James were an American soul group from Philadelphia, Pennsylvania formed by LeRoy Bell (drums, guitar) and Casey James (guitar, bass, keyboards).

Career
Both LeRoy Bell and Casey James had played in Special Blend before beginning to write songs together. Bell's uncle Thom Bell got them signed to Gamble & Huff as songwriters for Philadelphia International Records. They wrote tunes for Elton John, MFSB, The O'Jays, Gladys Knight & the Pips, Freda Payne, Phyllis Hyman, The Three Degrees, and others, before A&M Records took notice and signed them to a full album deal in 1978.

Three albums and several hit singles followed, including "Livin' It Up (Friday Night)", which hit No. 7 on the Billboard R&B singles chart and No. 15 on the Billboard Hot 100 in 1979. It sold over one million copies in the U.S., plus the same track reached No. 59 in the UK Singles Chart.

Discography

Albums

Singles

References

Musical groups from Philadelphia